Aswapiswanan Lake is a lake in the Hayes River drainage basin in Census Division No. 22 - Thompson-North Central, Northern Region, Manitoba, Canada. The primary inflows from west to east are the Hungry River, Porcupine Creek, the Bolton River and the Joint River. The primary outflow is the Mink River. The lake's waters eventually flow into Gods Lake, and via the Gods River and the Hayes River into Hudson Bay.

References

Lakes of Manitoba